Media Indonesia is an Indonesian daily newspaper published in Jakarta. Reports say Media Indonesia is the second largest newspaper in Indonesia after the Kompas daily. Media Indonesia'''s market share was growing from one percent to 18 percent in 2003 (AC Nielsen).

History
When Media Indonesia was first published in January 1970, it was a weekly newspaper with only four pages and very limited reporting. In 1976, it was enlarged to eight pages. In 1988, its founder, Teuku Yousli Syah, joined forces with Surya Paloh, the former owner of the newspaper Prioritas, and formed a new company, PT Citra Media Nusa Purnama. This marked the birth of the new Media Indonesia under the direction of a new management team. The newspaper was, at that time, run from an office in Gondangdia, Central Jakarta.

The new management set about improving the content and appearance of the paper, and its circulation grew rapidly. Media Indonesia now became available throughout the archipelago. Since 1995, Media Indonesia's operations have been located at the company's own offices in Kedoya, West Jakarta. In this building, all of the newspapers's function are assembled under one roof : editorial and reporting, management, printing, and even leisure facilities of the employees. Media Indonesia currently employs around 600 people. In addition to Media Indonesia'', the company also prints a number of other newspapers and tabloids on a contract basis.

References

External links
  

Media Group
Indonesian press
Newspapers published in Jakarta
1970 establishments in Indonesia
Publications established in 1970